Zote Nina Kpaho (born 30 December 1996) is an Ivorian professional footballer who plays for Istanbul-based club Fenerbahçe S.K. in the Turkish Women's First Football League. She was part of the Ivorian squad for the 2015 FIFA Women's World Cup.

See also
List of Ivory Coast women's international footballers

References

External links
 
 Profile at FIF 

1996 births
Living people
Ivory Coast women's international footballers
Place of birth missing (living people)
Women's association football defenders
2015 FIFA Women's World Cup players
Ivorian women's footballers
Ivorian expatriate footballers
Ivorian expatriate sportspeople in Belarus
Expatriate women's footballers in Belarus
FC Minsk (women) players
Turkish Women's Football Super League players
Expatriate women's footballers in Turkey
Ivorian expatriate sportspeople in Turkey
Fenerbahçe S.K. women's football players